Ranunculus rionii is a species of water crowfoot in the buttercup genus. It occurs from Europe to western China, and in North Africa, western North America and South Africa. The white, five-petaled flowers are arranged in cymes. The deciduous, tripinnate foliage has an opposite arrangement.

References

External links
 Ranunculus rionii, hortipedia.com 
 Ranunculus rionii, eFloras.org
 Ranunculus rionii, lifedesk.bibalex.org
 Ranunculus rionii Lagger, sanbi.org

rionii
Plants described in 1848